Terni is a city in the southern portion of the region of Umbria in central Italy. It is near the border with Lazio. The city is the capital of the province of Terni, located in the plain of the Nera river.

The Latin name means "between-two-rivers", in reference to its location on the confluence of the Nera river (Ancient Umbrian Nahar) and the Serra stream. When disambiguation was needed, it was referred to as Interamna Nahars. Its inhabitants were known in Latin as Interamnātēs Na(ha)rtēs.

Interamna was founded as an Ancient Roman town, albeit settlements in the Terni area well precede this occurrence. During the 19th century, steel mills were introduced and led the city to have a role in the second industrial revolution in Italy. Because of its industrial importance, the city was heavily bombed during World War II by the Allies. It remains an industrial hub and has been nicknamed "The Steel City".

Terni is also known as the "City of Lovers", as its patron saint, Saint Valentine, was born and became a bishop here, and the remains are preserved in the basilica-sanctuary in his honour.

History

The city was founded around the 7th century BC by the Umbrians Nahartes, in a territory inhabited (as testified by archaeological excavations) as early as the Bronze Age. The Iguvine Tablets describe these Nahartes as a strong, numerous people and as the most important enemy of the Umbrian people of Gubbio (Iguvium). In the 3rd century BC, Terni was conquered by the Romans and soon became an important municipium lying on the Via Flaminia and known under the name Interamna, meaning "between-two-rivers". 

In 271 BC the Roman consul Manius Curius Dentatus ordered the construction of a canal (the Curiano Trench) to divert the water from the marshes in the Rieti Valley and from Lake Velino over the natural cliff at Marmore, creating the waterfall. This caused flooding in the valley around Terni below. For a long time this became the cause of interminable quarrels between the cities of Rieti and Terni. The issue was so contentious between the two cities that the Roman Senate was forced to address it in 54 BC. Aulus Pompeius represented Terni, and Cicero represented Rieti. The Senate did nothing about the problem, and the problem remained the same for centuries. 

After the Lombard conquest in 755 Terni lost prominence when it was reduced to a secondary town in the Duchy of Spoleto. In 1174 it was sacked by Frederick Barbarossa's general, Archbishop Christian of Mainz. In the following century Terni was one of sites visited frequently by St. Francis to give sermons.

In the 14th century Terni issued its own constitution, and from 1353 the walls were enlarged, and new channels were opened. As with many of the Italian communes of the Late Middle Ages, it was beset by civil unrest between the partisans of the Guelphs and Ghibellines, and later between the Nobili and Banderari (Terni's bourgeoisie). Later it joined the Papal States. In 1580 an ironwork, the Ferriera, was introduced to work the iron ore mined in Monteleone di Spoleto, starting the traditional industrial connotation of the city. In the 17th century, however, the population of Terni declined further due to plagues and famines.

In the 19th century, Terni took advantage of the Industrial Revolution and of plentiful water sources in the area. New industries included a steelwork, a foundry, as well as weapons, jute and wool factories. In 1927 Terni became capital of the province. 

The presence of important industries made the city a favorite target for the Allied bombardments in World War II. On August 11, 1943, a raid by 44 USAAF bombers, which dropped 213 tons of bombs, devastated the city, killing 564 people. It was the first of the 57 air strikes that destroyed or damaged 40% of Terni's buildings and killed 1,018 civilians. Despite this, industrial environment increased quickly after the war.

Economy
The city has three important industrial hubs: the first one is the Stainless Steel Area, called AST (part of the group ThyssenKrupp) and is a wide area located in the east part of Terni. West of the town, there is a second industrial hub, known as "Area Polymer", with four different chemical multinational industries. The third industrial hub is Italeaf, which controls TerniEnergia, a company listed on STAR segment of Borsa Italiana, that is active in the renewable energy sector, and promotes and develops technological start-ups in the cleantech sector.

Transport
Terni is connected with the A1 motorway, the European route E45 and National Road Flaminia by the RATO, a motorway junction.

Terni railway station is part of the Ancona–Orte railway, and is also a junction station for two secondary lines, the Terni–Sulmona railway (which links Terni with L'Aquila) and the Terni–Sansepolcro railway (FCU) (which serves Perugia). One of the most important national freight stations is located nearby.
The local urban and suburban transport service, ATC, runs 90 bus lines. In the north of the city (Colleluna zone), there are works in progress on the line from Perugia to enable it to be used as a Light rail line.

Government

Monuments and sites of interest

Religious architecture or sites 
 Terni Cathedral (Duomo, Cattedrale di Santa Maria Assunta) (17th century). Built over one of the most ancient Christian edifices of the city, it has today Baroque lines. In the interior is one organ designed by Gian Lorenzo Bernini. The belfry is from the 18th century. The façade has two mediaeval gates: one of them has the profile of a sabot once used to measure the citizen's shoes in order to ensure that they did not exceed a fixed limit of decency.
 San Francesco – 13th-century church
 San Valentino: Basilica church
 Sant'Alò: (11th century) Romanesque church
 San Martino:  Romanesque church
 San Salvatore: Romanesque church

Secular and civic architecture or sites 

 Roman amphitheater, once capable of 10,000 spectators, built in 32 BC.
Porta Sant'Angelo, one of the four Ancient Roman Gates to the city, much restored.
Palazzo Mazzancolli is one of the few remains of the Middle Ages past of the city.
Palazzo Gazzoli (18th century), housing the City's Gallery with works by Pierfrancesco d'Amelia, Benozzo Gozzoli, Gerolamo Troppa and Orneore Metelli.
Palazzo Spada (16th century), designed by Antonio da Sangallo the Younger. It is the current Town Hall.
Santa Maria del Carmine, Terni: deconsecrated churchLancia di Luce ("Lance of Light"), by the sculptor Arnaldo Pomodoro.Cascata delle Marmore: a  waterfall nearby, at the confluence of the Velino and Nera Rivers, is the

Sport
Ternana Calcio is the main football club in the city. The club have twice played in Italy's first division Serie A (seasons 1972–1973 and 1974–1975). Ternana is currently playing in Serie B (season 2021–2022). The club play at the 22,000-seat Stadio Libero Liberati, named after Italian motorcycle racer Libero Liberati, who was born in Terni, won the 500cc World Championship in 1957, and died while he was training with his Gilera Saturno along the Valnerina road near Terni.

Notable natives
Historical
 House of Castelli First important family native of Terni of Germanic lineage. In the Middle Ages, Renaissance, Baroque and 18th century was an active family both in their city than in others. 
 House of Spada Central Italy's very important family, native of Terni. In middle age, Renaissance, Baroque and 18th century was an active family both in their city than in others.
 House of Camporeali Terni's very important family. In the Middle Ages and Renaissance was an active family both in their city than in others.
 House of Cittadini Central Italy's very important family, native of Terni, of Germanic lineage. In the Middle Ages and Renaissance was an active family both in their city than in others.
 House of Manassei Central Italy's very important family, native of Terni, of Germanic lineage. In the Middle Ages and Renaissance was an active family both in their city than in others.
 House of Mazzancolli Terni's very important family. In the Renaissance, Baroque and 18th century was an active family both in their city than in others.
 House of Tomassoni Terni's very important family. In the Renaissance, Baroque and 18th century was an active family both in their city than in others.
 House of Ciancherotti Terni's very important family. In the Renaissance, Baroque and 18th century was an active family both in their city than in others.
 House of Nicoletti Terni's very important family. In the Middle Ages, Renaissance, Baroque and 18th century was an active family both in their city than in others.
 Andrea Castelli da Terni (14th-15th century), condottiere and hero of the city-state of Terni, he was also a podestà and a politician.
 Alessandro and Lucantonio Tomassoni da Terni (16th century), condottiere brothers.
 Anastasio and Stefano Ciancherotti da Terni (16th-17th century), condottiere brothers.
 Blessed brother Barnaba Manassei (15th century) His greater fame's title is to have set up the order of Monti di Pietà to remedy the disastrous wear that impoverished families and city-states.
 Aminale Lodovico, a militar and adventurer who fought with other twelve Italian knights in the Challenge of Barletta (1503) against the French.
 Sir Cittadini (the Dragon Slayer), legendary hero of the city of Terni. He is the one who will free his city from the slavery of a dragon of the swamps.
 Saint Valentine, bishop and martyred saint
 Saints Berardo, Ottone, Pietro, Accursio and Adiuto, Franciscans protomartyrs.

Notable
 
 Francesco Angeloni, historian, art collector and writer of Historia di Terni.
 Baconin Borzacchini, Grand Prix motor racing driver.
 Giulio Briccialdi, composer and flautist.
 Alessandro Casagrande, composer and pianist.
 Aurelio De Felice, sculptor.
 Alessio Foconi, fencer
 Alvaro Leonardi, military aviator, highly decorated with the Silver Medal of Military Valor and with a War Merit Cross. Ace fighter, is credited with eight knockdowns during the First World War.
 Libero Liberati, 500 cc motorcycle racer, nicknamed "The Steel Knight" (Il Cavaliere d'Acciaio), 1957 500cc Grand Prix World Champion.
 Fabio Lucioni, football player
 Alessandro Manni, retired football player
 Stefano Micheli, musician (My Mine)
 Elia Rossi Passavanti political and military, then mayor of the city of Terni, and local historian, one of only two Italians to be decorated with the Medal of Military Valor in both the First and Second World Wars.
 Ettore Patrizi, publisher, L'Italia''
 Danilo Petrucci, Moto GP racer
 Claudio Petruccioli, politician and journalist
 Oreste Scalzone, political activist, founder of Potere Operaio
 Gaius Cornelius Tacitus, Roman historian
 Marcus Claudius Tacitus, Roman emperor
 Paolo Tagliavento, international football referee
 Sara Tommasi, actress
 Riccardo Zampagna, football player
 Lorela Cubaj, WNBA player

International relations

Twin towns – sister cities
Terni is twinned with:
 Cartagena, Spain
 Dunaújváros, Hungary
 Saint-Ouen-sur-Seine, France

References

External links
 Official website
 Terni city portal
 Terni Oggi

 
Roman sites of Umbria
Baroque architecture in Umbria
Cities and towns in Umbria